The Belarusian National Time Trial Championships is a cycling race where the Belarusian cyclists decide who will become the champion for the year to come.

Multiple winners
Riders that won the race more than once.

Men

Women

Men

Elite

Source:

U23

Women

See also
Belarusian National Road Race Championships
National road cycling championships

References

National road cycling championships
Cycle races in Belarus
Cycling